Rokautskyia odoratissima is a species of flowering plant in the family Bromeliaceae, endemic to Brazil (the state of Espírito Santo). It was first described by Elton Leme in 1990 as Cryptanthus odoratissimus.

References

odoratissima
Flora of Brazil
Plants described in 1990